Ramsin is a village and a sub tehsil in Jalore District of Rajasthan, India. There is an ancient temple called Aapeshwar mahadev temple situated here. The temple is on the banks of a river flowing from the Dam Called Vitan towards Sikwara just Near to Apeshwar Temple.

The village is situated on main road network of the district and therefore is a transport hub.
The nearest villages are Sikwara (4 km away), Moodatara (7 km), Mandoli Nagar (8 km), and Thur (11 km). The district headquarters Jalore is about 23 km to the north. This town is around 35 km north of Bhinmal, 17 km to the south of Bakra, 21 km to the north of Bagra and 21 km to the west of Siyana.

Marwar Bhinmal Railway Station is the nearest railway station, but people are normally using Bhinmal Railway Station due to frequency and convenience.
The economy of district is mainly based on agriculture and animal husbandry. The oilseeds specially mustard oil seed is predominant crop. Wheat, bajra, kharif pulses, barley, jowar and in very huge quantity of fleawort.

History
Ramsin is a very ancient village which currently exists as a town and sub-tehsil. According to mythological belief, Lord Rama, while going towards Chitrakoot during his fourteen years of exile, had rested for the night here, due to which the place was named as Ramchayan, being a disfigurement of Ramasayaana, Ramsen and then later Ramseen.

Ramsin has a very ancient temple of Lord Shiva known as Apeshwar Mahadev which is situated on the east side of the river passing through the middle of the village.

The town is mainly divided into four parts. In the middle is the main market on the eastern bank of the river, east of the market and there is an area called Vijayanagar situated on Sirohi road, where the cattle herder caste, Rebari and Bhil tribe is dominated, while one area is on Bhinmal road and one on Jaswantpura

References
 Ramseen Location
 Ramseen Population

Villages in Jalore district